Kutuleh or Kotuleh may refer to:

Kutuleh-ye Aziz Khan
Kutuleh-ye Baba Karam
Kutuleh-ye Hasan